The Three Peaks Cyclo-Cross is an annual cyclo-cross event over the Yorkshire three peaks of  Ingleborough, Whernside and Pen-y-ghent, in Yorkshire, England. It is organised by Bradford Racing Cycling Club on the last weekend of September.

Overview
The original course was 40 kilometres long, but was increased to 47 km in 1980. More course changes in 1982 and 1983 increased it further, to 50 km and then 57 km respectively. The most recent alteration, in 1994, extended the course to 61 km. The current course starts at Helwith Bridge, 3 km south of Horton in Ribblesdale, and tackles Ingleborough, Whernside and Pen-y-ghent. Because part of the race is on private land, cycling the whole course at any other time of year is not possible.

Except during the 1980s and early 1990s when mountain bikes were permitted, only cyclo-cross bicycles with drop handlebars are allowed. There were no female competitors until 1979, and there were no races in 2001 or 2007 due to foot and mouth disease.

Awards
Total Prize Money: £5,000+

Riders are awarded certificates based on their time around the course.
 Elite - under 3 hours 30 minutes
 1st class - under 4 hours
 2nd class - under 5 hours
 merit - all other finishers

List of overall winners

(source: "Results and Roll of Honour", 3 Peaks Cyclo-cross official website)

References

External links
 Three Peaks official website
 Three Peaks Cyclocross Blog

Cyclo-cross races
Cycle races in England
Recurring sporting events established in 1961
Yorkshire Three Peaks
1961 establishments in England
Cycling in Yorkshire